Bertil is a first name of Germanic origin most commonly found among Swedish men. The oldest recorded use is from the year 1396, but the name did not come into widespread use until the 19th century.

People called Bertil include:
Carl Bertil Agnestig (born 1924), Swedish music teacher and composer
Bertil Ahlin (1927–2008), Swedish bantamweight boxer
Bertil Albertsson (1921–2008), Swedish runner
Bertil Almgren (1918–2011), Swedish archaeologist
Bertil Almqvist (1902–1972), nicknamed Bertila and Trallgöken, Swedish author and illustrator
Bertil Anderberg (1913–1991), Swedish film actor
Bertil Andersson FAA FIC, third President of Nanyang Technological University (NTU)
Bertil Antonsson (1921–2006), Swedish heavyweight wrestler
Bertil Bäckvall (1923–2012), Swedish footballer and football manager
Bertil W. Benson (1843–1907), Norwegian-born American politician
Bertil Berg (1910–1989), Swedish water polo player who competed in the 1936 Summer Olympics
Bertil Berthelsson (1902–1977), Swedish Navy vice admiral
Bertil H. van Boer, American musicologist
Bertil Boo (1914–1996), Swedish singer
Bertil Bothén (1892–1966), Swedish sailor who competed in the 1912 Summer Olympics
Bertil Carlsson (skier) (1903–1953), Swedish ski jumper
Bertil Carlsson (weightlifter) (1901–1959), Swedish weightlifter
Bertil R. Carlsson (1901–1959), Swedish weightlifter
Bertil Elmstedt (born 1937), Swedish footballer
Bertil Envall (1909–2011), Swedish Lutheran missionary, bishop emeritus of the Evangelical Lutheran Church in Malaysia
Bertil Fastén (1900–1928), Swedish athlete
Bertil Fiskesjö (1928–2019), Swedish politician, member of the Centre Party
Bertil Fox (born 1951), British former IFBB professional bodybuilder and convicted murderer
Bertil von Friesen (1901–1990), Swedish physician
Bertil Gärtner (1924–2009), Swedish Lutheran bishop, and professor at Princeton Theological Seminary, United States
Bertil Göransson (1919–2004), Swedish rowing coxswain who competed in the 1956 Summer Olympics
Bertil Martinus Grov (born 1974), retired archer from Norway
Bertil Gustafsson (born 1939), Swedish applied mathematician and numerical analyst
Bertil Haase (1923–2014), Swedish pentathlete who competed at both Winter and Summer Olympics
Prince Bertil, Duke of Halland (1912–1997), third son of King Gustaf VI Adolf and his first wife
Bertil Hallin (born 1931), Swedish church musician and music teacher
Bertil Hille (born 1940), professor in the Department of Physiology and Biophysics at the University of Washington
Bertil Holmlund (born 1947), Swedish economist, Professor of Economics at Uppsala University
Bertil Hult (born 1941), Swedish businessman, founded the educational and language school company, EF Education First
Bertil Jansson (1898–1981), Swedish athlete
Bertil Palmar Johansen Johansen (born 1954), Norwegian contemporary composer and violinist
Bertil Johansson (1935–2021), Swedish football striker and football manager
Bertil Johansson (politician) (born 1930), Swedish politician
Bertil Johnsson (1915–2010), leading Swedish long and triple jumper
Bertil Jonasson (1918–2011), Swedish politician
Bertil Karlsson (1919–2012), Swedish athlete who competed at the 1952 Summer Olympics in Helsinki
Bertil Kjellberg (born 1953), Swedish politician of the Moderate Party
Bertil Larsson (born 1954), Swedish sport sailor 
Bertil Lindblad (1895–1965), Swedish astronomer
Bertil Linde (1907–1990), Swedish ice hockey player who won a silver medal at the 1928 Winter Olympics
Bertil Lintner (born 1953), Swedish journalist, author and strategic consultant and writer about Asia
Bertil Lundman (1899–1993), Swedish anthropologist
Bertil Malmberg (1889–1958), Swedish author, poet, and actor
Bertil Mårtensson (born 1945), Swedish author of science fiction, crime fiction and fantasy and also an academic philosopher
Bertil Näslund (1933–2016), Swedish economist and emeritus professor
Bertil Nilsson (born 1936), Swedish footballer
Bertil Nordahl (1917–1998), Swedish football player and manager
Bertil Nordenskjöld (1891–1975), Swedish Olympic footballer
Bertil Nordenstam (born 1936), Swedish botanist and professor
Bertil Nordqvist, Swedish ski-orienteering competitor 
Bertil Norman (born 1929), Swedish orienteering competitor
Bertil Norström (1923–2012), Swedish actor
Bertil Nyström (born 1935), Swedish Greco-Roman wrestler 
Bertil Ohlin (1899–1979), Swedish economist and politician
Bertil Ohlson (1899–1970), Swedish decathlete
Bertil Persson (alpine skier) (1914–1978), Swedish alpine skier
Bertil Persson (bishop) (born 1941), professor in religion and church arts, former Presiding Bishop of the Apostolic Episcopal Church
Bertil Persson (potter) (born 1940), Swedish Hagi ware potter based in Japan
Bertil Rönnmark (1905–1967), Swedish rifle sports shooter who competed in the 1932 Summer Olympics and in the 1936 Summer Olympics
Bertil Roos (1943–2016), Swedish racing driver from Gothenburg
Bertil Sandström (1887–1964), Swedish military officer and horse rider
Bertil Schmüll (born 1946), Dutch engraver
Bertil Söderberg (born 1947), Swedish handball player who competed in the 1972 Summer Olympics
Bertil Stålhane, (1902–1992), Swedish chemist, technical researcher and author
Bertil Stjernfelt (1917–2017), Swedish officer and military historian
Bertil Ströberg (1932–2012), Swedish Air Force officer convicted of spying for Poland during the Cold War
Bertil Sundberg (1907–1979), Sweden chess player
Bertil Svensson, Swedish footballer
Bertil Tallberg (1883–1963), Finnish sailor who competed in the 1912 Summer Olympics
Bertil Tunje, Vice-Chairman of the World Scout Committee
Bertil Uggla (1890–1945), Swedish track and field athlete, modern pentathlete and fencer
Bertil af Ugglas (1934–1977), Party Secretary of the Swedish Moderate Party, member of the Swedish Riksdag
Bertil von Wachenfeldt (1909–1995), Swedish sprinter who specialized in the 400 m distance
Bertil Wedin (born 1940), Swedish secret service agent
Bertil Werkström (1928–2010), Archbishop of Uppsala
Bertil Zachrisson (born 1926), Swedish politician
Amadeus (Bertil) Hägg (born 1969) Swedish fotboll master

See also
Bert Hill
Berti
Bertiella (disambiguation)
Bertillon

Masculine given names
Swedish masculine given names